Macrobathra niphadobola is a moth in the family Cosmopterigidae. It was described by Edward Meyrick in 1886. It is found in India and Sri Lanka.

References

Macrobathra
Moths described in 1886